Ole Qvist (born 25 February 1950 in Copenhagen) is a Danish former professional footballer who played a goalkeeper for Kjøbenhavns Boldklub and earned 39 caps with the Denmark national team from 1979 to 1986. He played all of Denmark's four matches at the 1984 European Championships. He was also an unused player at the 1986 FIFA World Cup team.

Throughout his playing career he continued to work as a Police Officer in the Traffic Divisions motorcycle unit.

His son Lasse Qvist is also a footballer. His father Hans Qvist was a renowned Danish cartoonist.

External links

1950 births
Living people
Footballers from Copenhagen
Danish men's footballers
Association football goalkeepers
Denmark international footballers
UEFA Euro 1984 players
1986 FIFA World Cup players
Kjøbenhavns Boldklub players
Danish police officers